Nikita Ivanovich Naidenov (6 April 1892 – 19 September 1961) was a Russian speed skater. In 1913 he won the national allround title and bronze medals at the European and world allround speed skating championships. Naidenov was also an accomplished pilot and fought in World War I. In June 1925, together with a group of several other Russian pilots, he flew 6476 km on Junkers F.13 from Moscow to Beijing.

References

1892 births
1961 deaths
Russian male speed skaters
World Allround Speed Skating Championships medalists